Marcel Granollers was the defending champion but lost in the first round to Radu Albot.

Aljaž Bedene won the title after defeating Mikhail Kukushkin 6–4, 3–6, 6–1 in the final.

Seeds

Draw

Finals

Top half

Bottom half

References
Main Draw
Qualifying Draw

Irving Tennis Classic - Singles
Irving Tennis Classic